The 1992–93 Texas Tech Lady Raiders basketball team represented Texas Tech University in the 1992–93 NCAA Division I women's basketball season. The Lady Raiders were led by head coach Marsha Sharp. The team won the 1993 NCAA Division I women's basketball tournament, the program's first NCAA title, and Texas Tech University's first NCAA team title.

1993 NCAA Tournament
The Lady Raiders advanced through the NCAA tournament, from the West Regional in Missoula, MT. After defeating the Colorado Buffaloes in the regional finals, went on to defeat the Vanderbilt Commodores in the final four. In the national championship game, the Lady Raiders defeated the Ohio State Buckeyes, 84-82. Sheryl Swoopes, whose 47 points set a single-game championship scoring performance, was named the Most Outstanding Player.

References

External links
Official Texas Tech Lady Raiders website 

Texas Tech Lady Raiders basketball seasons
Texas Tech
NCAA Division I women's basketball tournament championship seasons
NCAA Division I women's basketball tournament Final Four seasons
Texas Tech